Doug Armstrong (born 1964) is a Canadian ice hockey executive.

Doug Armstrong may also refer to:

 Doug Armstrong (broadcaster) (1931–2015), New Zealand cricketer, broadcaster and politician
 Doug Armstrong (YouTuber) (born 1992), British web video presenter
 Doug Armstrong (curler), Canadian skip
 Doug Armstrong (musician), former bassist for the Australian band Jet

See also
 Douglas Armstrong (disambiguation)